Renzo Olivo was the defending champion but lost in the quarterfinals to Horacio Zeballos.

Nicolás Kicker won the title after defeating Zeballos 6–7(5–7), 6–0, 7–5 in the final.

Seeds

Draw

Finals

Top half

Bottom half

References
Main Draw
Qualifying Draw

Copa Fila - Singles
2017 Singles